Carroll's Hill is a mountain in Offaly, in the Republic of Ireland.

Geography 

See also
List of mountains in Ireland

References

Mountains and hills of County Offaly